Andrzej Alojzy Ankwicz (22 June 1777 – 26 March 1838) was the Roman Catholic archbishop of Prague from 1833 to 1838.

Biography
Ankwicz was born in Kraków, Poland in 1777. He was ordained a priest on 2 September 1810. In 1815, he was appointed and ordained archbishop of Lviv in Ukraine. He remained in this capacity for 18 years until 30 September 1833 when he was appointed the archbishop of Prague. He died at the age of 60 years on 26 March 1838 to be succeeded in his archbishopric by Alois Josef Schrenk.

References

External links
 Archbishop Andrzej Alojzy Ankwicz profile at Catholic-Hierarchy 

1777 births
1838 deaths
Clergy from Kraków
Clan Abdank
18th-century Polish Roman Catholic priests
Polish Austro-Hungarians
Roman Catholic archbishops in the Austrian Empire
Archbishops of Lviv
Roman Catholic archbishops of Prague
Czech people of Polish descent